Hørdum station is a railway station serving the small railway town of Hørdum in Thy, Denmark.

Hørdum station is located on the Thy Line from Struer to Thisted. The station was opened in 1882 with the opening of the Thy Line. It offers direct InterCity services to Copenhagen and Thisted as well as regional train services to Struer and Thisted. The train services are operated by Arriva and DSB.

See also
 List of railway stations in Denmark

References

Citations

Bibliography

External links

 Banedanmark – government agency responsible for maintenance and traffic control of most of the Danish railway network
 DSB – largest Danish train operating company
 Arriva – British multinational public transport company operating bus and train services in Denmark
 Danske Jernbaner – website with information on railway history in Denmark

Railway stations in the North Jutland Region
Railway stations opened in 1882
1882 establishments in Denmark
Railway stations in Denmark opened in the 19th century